Lee County is a county located in the U.S. state of Illinois. According to the 2010 census, it has a population of 36,031. Its county seat is Dixon.

The Dixon, IL Micropolitan Statistical Area includes all of Lee County.

History
The area's first non-native settlers were mostly from the six New England states. The early nineteenth century saw a wave of westward movement from New England, due largely to completion of the Erie Canal and the end of the Black Hawk War.

The area that included present-day Lee County was delineated as St. Clair County in 1809. In 1823, a large section of northern St. Clair County was partitioned off as Fulton County. In 1825, the northwestern portion of that county was partitioned off as Putnam County. In 1831, the area was further partitioned into Jo Daviess County. A section of that county was partitioned off in 1836 as Ogle County, and in 1839 the bottom half of Ogle County was split off as Lee County. It is largely understood that the county's name honors "Lighthorse Harry" Lee, an officer in the American Revolutionary War. An alternative theory suggests the name honors Richard Henry Lee, a member of the Continental Congress (the Declaration of Independence was adopted pursuant to the Lee Resolution).

President Ronald Reagan lived in Dixon as a boy and attended Dixon High School.

Geography

Adjacent counties
 Ogle County – north
 DeKalb County – east
 LaSalle County - southeast, south
 Bureau County – south, southwest
 Whiteside County – west

Climate and weather

Major highways

  Interstate 39
  Interstate 88
  U.S. Highway 30
  U.S. Highway 51
  U.S. Highway 52
  Illinois Route 2
  Illinois Route 26
  Illinois Route 38
  Illinois Route 110
  Illinois Route 251

Other features
 Green River Ordnance Plant
 Mendota Hills Wind Farm

Demographics

As of the 2010 United States Census, there were 36,031 people, 13,758 households, and 9,064 families residing in the county. The racial makeup of the county was 90.9% white, 4.8% black or African American, 0.7% Asian, 0.2% American Indian, 1.9% from other races, and 1.5% from two or more races. Those of Hispanic or Latino origin made up 5.0% of the population. In terms of ancestry, 38.0% were German, 18.8% were Irish, 8.4% were English, and 8.2% were American.

Of the 13,758 households, 30.0% had children under the age of 18 living with them, 51.2% were married couples living together, 10.0% had a female householder with no husband present, 34.1% were non-families, and 28.8% of all households were made up of individuals. The average household size was 2.41 and the average family size was 2.94. The median age was 42.0 years.

The median income for a household in the county was $48,502 and the median income for a family was $60,759. Males had a median income of $42,114 versus $30,920 for females. The per capita income for the county was $24,440. About 7.6% of families and 9.6% of the population were below the poverty line, including 11.8% of those under age 18 and 6.5% of those age 65 or over.

Communities

Cities
 Amboy
 Dixon (county seat)

Villages

 Ashton
 Compton
 Franklin Grove
 Harmon
 Lee
 Nelson
 Paw Paw
 Steward
 Sublette
 West Brooklyn

Unincorporated communities

 Binghampton
 The Burg

Townships

 Alto
 Amboy
 Ashton
 Bradford
 Brooklyn
 Dixon
 East Grove
 Franklin Grove
 Hamilton
 Harmon
 Lee Center
 Marion
 May
 Nachusa
 Nelson
 Palmyra
 Reynolds
 South Dixon
 Sublette
 Viola
 Willow Creek
 Wyoming

Politics
Lee County is, together with neighboring Ogle County, the most consistently Republican county in Illinois. It is one of very few counties in the United States to have never supported a Democrat for President since the Civil War. The only occasion when the Republican candidate did not win the county in this time was in 1912, when Theodore Roosevelt carried it while running as a member of the Progressive Party, unofficially known as the "Bull Moose" party.

As of 2018, Lee County is in the 16th congressional district, the 45th legislative district, and the 74th and 90th representative districts.

See also
 National Register of Historic Places listings in Lee County, Illinois

Notes

References

External links
 County Name
 Alternate version of County Name
 Illinois State Archives

 
Illinois counties
1839 establishments in Illinois
Populated places established in 1839